Metarbelodes obliqualinea is a moth in the family Cossidae described by George Thomas Bethune-Baker in 1909. It is found in Kenya and Uganda.

References

Metarbelinae
Moths described in 1909